In the 2018–19 season, USM Alger competed in the Ligue 1 for the 41st season, as well as the Confederation Cup, Club Championship, and the Algerian Cup. It was their 24th consecutive season in the top flight of Algerian football.

Season summary 
With the end of the 2017–18 season USM Alger started looking for a new coach and the squad saw the departure of many players, most notably Ayoub Abdellaoui, who joined the Swiss club FC Sion. and striker Oussama Darfalou, who joined Dutch club Vitesse. finally, after a month of research, the team contracted with French technical Thierry Froger to be the new coach. This season USM Alger is competing on four fronts Ligue 1, Algerian Cup, Confederation Cup and Arab Club Champions Cup, The first goals was to win the Confederation Cup, but they are eliminated in the quarter-finals against the Egyptian club Al-Masry. Then in the Arab Club Champions Cup was the ambition to win, especially that the value of financial prizes exceed 15 million dollars. more than the CAF Champions League, but the march of The Reds and Blacks stopped in the second round against the Sudanese Al-Merrikh 4–3 on aggregate. then moved USM Alger's attention to the Ligue 1 Leader in the standings, the USMA counts 33 units and ensures at the same time to finish first at the end of the first phase of the championship Followed by JS Kabylie.

After the outbreak of protests in Algeria and the arrest of club owner Ali Haddad on corruption charges. affected the results of USM Alger where he was defeated in three consecutive games, all Darby matches against Paradou AC, MC Alger and CR Belouizdad to shrink the difference to one point from the runner-up four games before the end of the season. On April 30, 2019 The board of the SSPA USMA met and noted the vacancy of the post of president of the company since the incarceration of Ali Haddad there is nearly a month. It was Boualem Chendri who was unanimously elected to succeed him while ETRHB Haddad remains the majority shareholder of the club. On May 26, 2019 And after the victory outside the home against CS Constantine 3–1 achieved the eighth Ligue 1 title, one point behind JS Kabylie. immediately after the end of the game Abdelhakim Serrar announced his resignation from his office.

Pre-season and friendlies

Competitions

Overview

{| class="wikitable" style="text-align: center"
|-
!rowspan=2|Competition
!colspan=8|Record
!rowspan=2|Started round
!rowspan=2|Final position / round
!rowspan=2|First match
!rowspan=2|Last match
|-
!
!
!
!
!
!
!
!
|-
| Ligue 1

| 
| style="background:gold;"| Winners
| 14 August 2018
| 26 May 2019
|-
| Algerian Cup

| Round of 64
| Round of 16
| 18 December2018
| 22 January 2019
|-
| Confederation Cup

| Group stage
| Quarter-final
| 18 July 2018
| 23 September 2018
|-
| Club Championship

| First round
| Second round
| 8 August 2018
| 10 December 2018
|-
! Total

Ligue 1

League table

Results summary

Results by round

Matches

Algerian Cup

Confederation Cup

Group stage

Group D

Knockout stage

Quarter-finals

Club Championship Cup

First round

Second round

Squad information

Playing statistics

Appearances (Apps.) numbers are for appearances in competitive games only including sub appearances
Red card numbers denote:   Numbers in parentheses represent red cards overturned for wrongful dismissal.

(B) – USM Alger B player

Goalscorers
Includes all competitive matches. The list is sorted alphabetically by surname when total goals are equal.

Suspensions

Clean sheets
Includes all competitive matches.

Squad list
Players and squad numbers last updated on 26 May 2019.Note: Flags indicate national team as has been defined under FIFA eligibility rules. Players may hold more than one non-FIFA nationality.

Transfers

In

Out

New contracts

Kit
Supplier: Joma
Sponsor: Djezzy

Notes

References

2018-19
Algerian football clubs 2018–19 season